Captain Elmore Philpott (May 2, 1896 – December 9, 1964) was a Canadian politician and journalist. Philpott joined the Canadian military during World War I and was badly wounded – he needed two canes to help him walk for the rest of his life.

He was working as an editorial writer for the Toronto Globe when he ran for the leadership of the Ontario Liberal Party in its 1930 leadership convention. He lost badly to Mitchell Hepburn. The next year, he attempted to become a member of the Legislative Assembly of Ontario through a by-election, but was defeated.

In 1933, Philpott resigned from the Globe to join the new Co-operative Commonwealth Federation (CCF) and was asked to lead a campaign organizing Clubs for the Ontario CCF. The CCF in Ontario was organized into three sections at the time: the United Farmers of Ontario (UFO), the Labour Conference made up of socialist and labour groups, and the CCF Clubs. Philpott became the president of the Ontario Association of CCF Clubs, one of the key leaders of the party in the province, and a popular stump speaker for the socialist cause.

After twenty months of intense work in the party, including leading a purge of communists, Philpott suddenly resigned in March 1934 as president of the Ontario CCF clubs, ostensibly because he was the UFO candidate for Halton in the upcoming federal election and the UFO had left the Ontario CCF over the purported influence of Communists. In March 1935, he announced he was rejoining the Liberal Party of Canada and was nominated as the Liberal candidate in the riding of York South for the 1935 election and proceeded to claim there was a "sinister conspiracy" to merge the CCF and the Communists with Communist Party head Tim Buck as leader of the new socialist party, a claim that Ontario CCF organizer Ted Jolliffe decried as a "fantastic fabrication". In the election, Philpott placed third behind the Conservative and CCF candidates.

Philpott returned to journalism and moved to British Columbia in the 1940s where he became a reporter and then a columnist for the Vancouver Sun. He ran as an Independent candidate in the federal by-election held in the riding of New Westminster in 1949, placing second behind the Liberal candidate.

He was finally elected to the House of Commons of Canada in the 1953 election as the Liberal Member of Parliament (MP) for Vancouver South. He was defeated in the 1957 election. He attempted to return to the House of Commons as a Liberal candidate in the 1958 general election in Vancouver South, and in the 1962 general election in Okanagan Boundary, but was badly defeated both times.

Philpott died in Vancouver in 1964.

References

External links
 

1896 births
1964 deaths
Members of the House of Commons of Canada from British Columbia
Liberal Party of Canada MPs
Journalists from British Columbia
Journalists from Ontario
Co-operative Commonwealth Federation politicians
20th-century Canadian politicians